There have been 29 coaches of the Parramatta Eels since their first season in 1947.

List of coaches
As of the end of the 2021 NRL season

See also

List of current NRL coaches
List of current NRL Women's coaches

References

External links

Sydney-sport-related lists
National Rugby League lists
Lists of rugby league coaches